Kilpatrick, is a civil parish in County Westmeath, Ireland.

Kilpatrick is one of 8 civil parishes in the barony of Fore in the Province of Leinster.

Kilpatrick civil parish comprises 3 townlands: Clondalever, Kilpatrick and Tuitestown.

The neighbouring civil parishes are: St. Feighin's  to the north, Killulagh to the east, Rathconnell and Taghmon to the south and Faughalstown to the west and north.

References

External links
Kilpatrick civil parish at openstreetmap.org
Kilpatrick civil parish at the IreAtlas Townland Data Base
Kilpatrick civil parish at townlands.ie
Kilpatrick civil parish at The Placename Database of Ireland

Civil parishes of County Westmeath